The Oosterscheldekering ( English: Eastern Scheldt storm surge barrier), between the islands Schouwen-Duiveland and Noord-Beveland, is the largest of the Delta Works, a series of dams and storm surge barriers, designed to protect the Netherlands from flooding from the North Sea. The construction of the Delta Works was a response to the widespread damage and loss of life in the North Sea flood of 1953.

Surge barrier 
The longest dam in the Delta Works, the nine-kilometre-long Oosterscheldekering (kering meaning barrier) was initially designed, and partly built, as a closed dam, but after public protests, huge sluice-gate-type doors were installed in the remaining four kilometres. These doors are normally open, but can be closed under adverse weather conditions. In this way, the saltwater marine life behind the dam is preserved and fishing can continue, while the land behind the dam is safe from the water.

On 4 October 1986, Queen Beatrix officially opened the dam for use by saying the well-known words: "De stormvloedkering is gesloten. De Deltawerken zijn voltooid. Zeeland is veilig." (The flood barrier is closed. The Delta Works are completed. Zeeland is safe.)

At the artificial island Neeltje-Jans, at one end of the barrier, a plaque is installed with the words: "Hier gaan over het tij, de maan, de wind en wij" ("Here the tide is ruled by the moon, the wind and us").

Construction 

The Oosterscheldekering was the most difficult to build and most expensive part of the Delta works. Work on the dam took more than a decade. It was constructed by a consortium of contractors comprising Ballast Nedam, Boskalis Westminster, Baggermaatschappij Breejenhout, Hollandse Aanneming Maatschappij, Hollandse Beton Maatschappij, Van Oord-Utrecht, Stevin Baggeren, Stevin Beton en Waterbouw, Adriaan Volker Baggermaatschappij, Adriaan Volker Beton en Waterbouw and Aannemerscombinatie Zinkwerken. Construction started in April 1976 and was completed in June 1986. The road over the dam was ready for use in November 1987.

The road was opened by the former queen, Princess Juliana on 5 November 1987, exactly 457 years after the St Felix Day's flood of 1530, which had washed away a large chunk of Zeeland, upstream of the new barrier's position.

To facilitate the building, an artificial island, Neeltje-Jans, was created in the middle of the estuary. When the construction was finished, the island was rebuilt to be used as education centre for visitors and as a base for maintenance works.

The dam is based on 65 concrete pillars with 62 steel doors, each 42 metres wide. The parts were constructed in a dry dock. The area was flooded and a small fleet of special construction ships lifted the pillars and placed them in their final positions. Each pillar is between 35 and 38.75 metres high and weighs 18000 tonnes. The dam is designed to last more than 200 years.

The Oosterscheldekering is sometimes referred to as the eighth Wonder of the World. It has been declared one of the modern Seven Wonders of the World by the American Society of Civil Engineers.

Construction fleet 

Four ships were custom designed and built for this project:
 Mytilus, a ship equipped with various ground working tools, such as needles to make the seabed denser and more stable.
 Cardium, a ship to transport and lay a special foil carpet on the seabed for the pillars to rest on.
 Ostrea, a ship capable of lifting a concrete pillar from the dry dock and placing it accurately on a special foil on the seabed. The ship is 85 metres long and has a portal 50 metres high. The ship can only lift 10,000 tonnes, but as a large part of the pillar is underwater, it is not necessary for the ship to be able to lift the full 18,000 tonnes. This ship is considered the flagship of the construction fleet, mainly because of its larger size and power in comparison to the other ships.
 Macoma, a ship that works closely with the Ostrea, cleaning the foil assisting in placing the pillars accurately in their final position.
The ships are named after various types of shellfish.

Operation 
The dam is manually operated but if human control fails, an electronic security system acts as a backup. A Dutch law regulates the conditions under which the dam is allowed to close. The water levels must be at least three meters above regular sea level before the doors can be completely shut. Each sluice gate is closed once a month for testing. Emergency procedures are tested on pre-scheduled dates. Once the test is passed, the shutters are quickly opened again to create a minimum amount of effect on tidal movements and the local marine ecosystem. It takes approximately one hour to close a door. The cost of operation is €17 million per year.

The full dam has been closed twenty-eight times since 1986, due to water levels exceeding or being predicted to exceed the three metres. The last time was on January 31 2022, because of Storm Corrie.

Further reading

References

External links 

Satellite view from Google Maps
 DeltaWorks.org – DeltaWorks.Org about Oosterscheldekering. Includes text, photos, video and virtual tour.

Delta Works
Flood barriers in the Netherlands
Dams completed in 1986
Dams in Zeeland
Tourist attractions in Zeeland
Buildings and structures in Schouwen-Duiveland
Noord-Beveland